Gregory S. Hotham (born March 7, 1956) is a Canadian former professional ice hockey defenceman. He played 230 games in the National Hockey League with the Toronto Maple Leafs and Pittsburgh Penguins between 1979 and 1985. He was selected by the Maple Leafs in the 5th round, 84th overall, of the 1976 NHL Amateur Draft. Hotham was born in London, Ontario, but grew up in Aurora, Ontario.

Family
Hotham's sons Scott (born 1984) and Andrew (born 1986) are both professional ice hockey players. Scott played the 2011–12 season in the Austrian Hockey League, and Andrew played the 2012–13 season with the Wheeling Nailers of the ECHL, and the Oklahoma City Barons of the AHL.

Career statistics

Regular season and playoffs

References

External links
 

1956 births
Living people
Baltimore Skipjacks players
Canadian ice hockey defencemen
Cincinnati Tigers players
Dallas Black Hawks players
Ice hockey people from Ontario
Kingston Canadians players
New Brunswick Hawks players
Newmarket Saints players
Pittsburgh Penguins players
Saginaw Gears players
Sportspeople from Aurora, Ontario
Sportspeople from London, Ontario
Toronto Maple Leafs draft picks
Toronto Maple Leafs players
Canadian expatriate ice hockey players in the United States